The 1982–83 Maltese Premier League was the 3rd season of the Maltese Premier League, and the 68th season of top-tier football in Malta.  It was contested by 8 teams, and Hamrun Spartans F.C. won the championship.

The season saw the relegation of Sliema Wanderers F.C. after seventy-three years in the top flight, one of the most historic teams in Maltese football, for the first time in their history.

League standings

Results

References
Malta - List of final tables (RSSSF)

Maltese Premier League seasons
Malta
1982–83 in Maltese football